John Randolph Webb (April 2, 1920 – December 23, 1982) was an American actor, television producer, director, and screenwriter, most famous for his role as Joe Friday in the Dragnet franchise, which he created. He was also the founder of his own production company, Mark VII Limited.

Webb started his career in the 1940s as a radio personality, starring in several radio shows and dramas—including Dragnet, which he created in 1949—before shifting to acting in the 1950s, creating television adaptations of Dragnet for NBC. Throughout the 1960s, Webb worked in both acting and television production, creating Adam-12 in 1968, and in 1970, Webb retired from acting to focus on producing, creating Emergency! in 1972. Webb continued to make television series, and although many of them were less successful and short-lived, he wished to rekindle his prior successes, and had plans to return to acting in a Dragnet revival before he died.

Webb's production style aimed for significant levels of detail and accuracy. Many of his works focused on law enforcement and emergency services in the Los Angeles area, most prominently the Los Angeles Police Department (LAPD), which directly supported the production of Dragnet and Adam-12. A staunch conservative, Webb often used his works to voice his opinions on political and social issues, evident in the speeches he would embed into Dragnet's scripts. In the 21st century, some of Webb's works, especially Dragnet, have been re-examined and characterized as right-wing and copaganda, with criticism over his close relationships with police officials, though his lasting effects on American popular culture remain.

Early life
Webb was born in Santa Monica, California, on April 2, 1920, son of Samuel Chester Webb and Margaret (née Smith) Webb. He grew up in the Bunker Hill section of Los Angeles. His father left home before Webb was born, and Webb never knew him.

In the late 1920s and early 1930s, Webb lived in the parish of Our Lady of Loretto Church and attended Our Lady of Loretto Elementary School in Echo Park, where he served as an altar boy. He then attended Belmont High School, near downtown Los Angeles. Webb was elected student body president of his high school. He wrote to Belmont's student body in the 1938 edition of its yearbook, Campanile, "You who showed me the magnificent warmth of friendship which I know, and you know, I will carry with me forever." Webb attended St. John's University, Minnesota, where he studied art.
 
During World War II, Webb enlisted in the United States Army Air Corps, but he "washed out" of flight training. He later received a hardship discharge because he was the primary financial support for both his mother and grandmother.

Career

Acting
Following his discharge, he moved to San Francisco, where a wartime shortage of announcers led to a temporary appointment to his own radio show on ABC's KGO Radio. The Jack Webb Show was a half-hour comedy that had a limited run on ABC radio in 1946. Prior to that, he had a one-man program, One Out of Seven, on KGO in which he dramatized a news story from the previous week.

By 1949, he had abandoned comedy for drama, and starred in Pat Novak, for Hire, a radio show originating from KFRC about a man who worked as an unlicensed private detective. The program co-starred Raymond Burr. Pat Novak was notable for writing that imitated the hard-boiled style of such writers as Raymond Chandler, with lines such as: "She drifted into the room like 98 pounds of warm smoke. Her voice was hot and sticky—like a furnace full of marshmallows." Early in 1949, Webb served as the main antagonist of Alan Ladd's protagonist character Dan Holliday in "The Better Man" episode of the radio series "Box 13", which aired on January 2, 1949.

Webb's radio shows included Johnny Madero, Pier 23, Jeff Regan, Investigator, Murder and Mr. Malone, Pete Kelly's Blues, and One Out of Seven. Webb provided all of the voices on One Out of Seven, often vigorously attacking racial prejudice.

In 1950, Webb appeared in three films that would become cult classics. In Sunset Boulevard, he is the fiancé of William Holden's love interest Nancy Olson (his performance is very animated and jovial, unlike his later deadpan style). He played a war veteran in Marlon Brando's first feature, The Men. And in the film noir Dark City, he co-starred with Harry Morgan, his future partner on the second Dragnet series.

Webb's most famous motion-picture role was as the combat-hardened Marine Corps drill instructor at Parris Island in the 1957 film The D.I., with Don Dubbins as a callow Marine private. Webb's hard-nosed approach to this role, that of Drill Instructor Technical Sergeant James Moore, would be reflected in much of his later acting, but The D.I. was a box office failure.

Webb was approached to play the role of Vernon Wormer, Dean of Faber College, in National Lampoon's Animal House, but he refused it, saying "the movie didn't make any damn sense"; John Vernon ultimately played the role.

Dragnet and stardom 
Webb had a featured role as a crime-lab technician in the 1948 film He Walked by Night, based on the real-life murder of a California Highway Patrolman by Erwin Walker. The film was produced in semidocumentary style with technical assistance provided by Detective Sergeant Marty Wynn of the Los Angeles Police Department. He Walked By Night's thinly veiled fictionalized recounting of the 1946 Walker crime spree gave Webb the idea for Dragnet: a recurring series based on real cases from LAPD police files, featuring authentic depictions of the modern police detective, including methods, mannerisms, and technical language.

With much assistance from Sgt. Marty Wynn and legendary LAPD chief William H. Parker, Dragnet premiered on NBC Radio in 1949 and ran till 1957. It was also picked up as a television series by NBC, which aired episodes each season from 1952 to 1959. Webb played Sgt. Joe Friday and Barton Yarborough co-starred as Sgt. Ben Romero. After Yarborough's death, Ben Alexander joined the cast.

Webb was a stickler for attention to detail. He believed viewers wanted "realism" and tried to give it to them. Webb had tremendous respect for those in law enforcement. He often said, in interviews, that he was angry about the "ridiculous amount" of abuse to which police were subjected by the press and the public. Webb was also impressed by the long hours, the low pay, and the high injury rate among police investigators of the day, particularly in the LAPD, which had by then acquired a notorious reputation for jettisoning officers who had become ill or injured in the line of duty; in Webb's book, The Badge: True and Terrifying Crime Stories that Could Not Be Presented on TV, from the Creator and Star of "Dragnet", one of Erwin Walker's victims, LAPD detective Lt. Colin Forbes, was among those whose experiences were so noted.

In announcing his vision of Dragnet, Webb said he intended to perform a service for the police by showing them as low-key working-class heroes. Dragnet moved away from earlier portrayals of the police in shows such as Jeff Regan and Pat Novak, which had often shown them as brutal and even corrupt. Dragnet became a successful television show in 1952. Barton Yarborough died of a heart attack in 1951, after filming only two episodes, and Barney Phillips (Sgt. Ed Jacobs) and Herbert Ellis (Officer Frank Smith) temporarily stepped in as partners. Veteran radio and film actor Ben Alexander took over the role of jovial, burly Officer Frank Smith. Alexander was popular and remained a cast member until the show's cancellation in 1959. In 1954, a full-length feature-film adaptation of the series was released, starring Webb, Alexander, and Richard Boone.

The television version of Dragnet began with this narration by George Fenneman: "Ladies and gentlemen, the story you are about to see is true. The names have been changed to protect the innocent." Webb would intone, "This is the city: Los Angeles, California." He would then make a historical or topical point, describe his duties, his partner, and superior on the episode. The radio series had a similar opening, though Webb, as Friday, did not give a unique LA-themed opening. Webb then set the plot by describing a typical day and then led into the story. "It was Wednesday, March 19th. It was cool in Los Angeles. I was at headquarters, working narcotics...." At the end of each show, Fenneman repeated his opening narration, revised to read: "The story you have just seen is true. The names were changed to protect the innocent."

A second announcer, Hal Gibney, usually gave dates when and specific courtrooms where trials were held for the suspects, announcing the trial verdicts after commercial breaks. Many suspects shown to have been found guilty at the end were also shown as having been confined to the California State Prison at San Quentin. Webb frequently recreated entire floors of buildings on sound stages, such as the police headquarters at Los Angeles City Hall and a floor of the Los Angeles Herald-Examiner.

During Dragnet's early days, Webb continued to appear in movies, notably as Artie Green, the best friend of William Holden's character in the 1950 Billy Wilder film Sunset Boulevard. The character Green was an assistant director and fiancé to script reader Betty Schaefer (played by Nancy Olson).  
In "Dark City," Webb played a vicious card sharp and Harry Morgan a punch-drunk ex-fighter, in contrast to the pair's straight-arrow image in the later Dragnet. Also in 1950, Webb appeared in The Men, Marlon Brando's debut film. Both actors played paraplegics undergoing rehabilitation at a veterans' hospital. In a subplot, Webb's character, a cynical intellectual, is fleeced of his life savings by a woman who feigns romantic interest.

In 1951, Webb introduced a short-lived radio series, Pete Kelly's Blues, in an attempt to bring the music he loved to a broader audience. That show became the basis for a 1955 film of the same name. In 1959, a television version was made. Neither was very successful. Pete Kelly was a cornet player who supplemented his income from playing in a nightclub band by working as a private investigator.

1960s
In 1963, Webb succeeded William T. Orr as executive producer of the ABC/Warner Bros. detective series 77 Sunset Strip. He brought about wholesale changes in the program and retained only Efrem Zimbalist Jr., in the role of private detective Stuart Bailey. The result was a disaster, and critics accused Webb of being out of touch with the younger generation of viewers. 

That same year, Webb sold Temple Houston to NBC. The show, starring Jeffrey Hunter, followed the exploits of Temple Lea Houston, a circuit-riding lawyer and the youngest son of Sam Houston. Despite Webb and Hunter's high profiles, however, it ended after its 26-week run. In a 1965 interview with The Milwaukee Journal, Hunter described the situation:

1967: Dragnet returns

Shortly after leaving his position at Warner Bros., Webb teamed with Universal Television to begin work on a new Dragnet series. A pilot television film, based on the Harvey Glatman serial killings, was produced in 1966 for NBC, with Webb's Sgt. Joe Friday joined by Harry Morgan as Officer Bill Gannon. Webb had tried to get Ben Alexander to reprise his role as Frank Smith, but Alexander would not leave the ABC series Felony Squad.

The new Dragnet premiered as a midseason replacement series on January 12, 1967, and aired until April 16, 1970. To distinguish it from the original series, the year of production was added to the title (Dragnet 1967, Dragnet 1968, etc.). The revival emphasized crime prevention and outreach to the public. Its attempts to address the contemporary youth-drug culture (such as the revival's first episode, "The LSD Story", guest-starring Michael Burns as Benjamin John "Blue Boy" Carver, voted 85th-best TV episode of all time by TV Guide and TV Land) have led certain episodes on the topic to achieve cult status due to their strained attempts to be "with-it", such as Joe Friday grilling "Blue Boy" by asking him, "You're pretty high and far out, aren't you? What kind of kick are you on, son?" Don Dubbins, who had acted alongside Webb in The D.I. in 1957, was featured in the second Dragnet 1967 episode, "The Big Explosion," and was another featured actor in Mark VII Limited programs beginning in the 1960s. Other Webb-affiliated actors featured in the revived series many times in different roles were Virginia Gregg, Peggy Webber, Clark Howat, Olan Soule, Bobby Troup, Tim Donnelly, and Marco Lopez.

In 1968, Webb and his production partner R.A. Cinader launched Adam-12 on NBC. A spinoff of Dragnet, Adam-12 starred Martin Milner and Kent McCord as a pair of LAPD officers, and followed their escapades while on patrol. Running until 1975 for a total of seven seasons, Adam-12 was Webb's second-longest running television series, with the eight seasons recorded by the original Dragnet being the longest.

Also in 1968, Webb and Johnny Carson performed a sketch on The Tonight Show that has since become known as the "Copper Clapper Caper" sketch. Webb, in character as Joe Friday, was working on the case of a robbery at a school-bell factory. Carson played the owner of the factory and victim of the theft, which consisted of each bell being relieved of its clapper (the device that makes the bell ring). The sketch's dialogue consisted of Webb and Carson discussing the situation in deadpan style and using alliteration and tongue twisters to describe the incident, each word having either a "c" or "cl" sound at the beginning. Both Webb and Carson tried desperately not to lose composure, but both did, near the end of the sketch.

1970s and 1980s

In 1970, Webb decided to bring an end to Dragnet and cease acting to focus on expanding Mark VII Limited's production profile. In 1971, Webb entered the world of district attorneys and federal government work with two series. The first, The D.A., starred Robert Conrad and Harry Morgan as a pair of Los Angeles County ADAs, with Conrad playing a junior ADA and Morgan his superior. The second, O'Hara, United States Treasury, was a co-production of Webb and David Janssen, the former star of The Fugitive and future star of Harry O, for CBS (a rare non-NBC Mark VII effort) and featured Janssen as a Nebraska county sheriff-turned-United States Treasury Department agent. Neither series lasted very long, as The D.A., Webb's last 30-minute series, was cancelled after 15 episodes and O'Hara ended after 22.

Later in the 1971–72 season, Webb and Cinader launched Emergency!, which focused on the fictional Station 51 Rescue Squad of the L.A. County Fire Department, and its work in coordination with the emergency department staff of the fictional Rampart General Hospital. LACoFD's paramedic program was among the first paramedic services in the United States. Webb cast his ex-wife, Julie London, as well as her second husband and Dragnet ensemble player Bobby Troup, as head nurse Dixie McCall and Dr. Joe Early, respectively, with Randolph Mantooth and Kevin Tighe playing paramedics John Gage and Roy DeSoto and Robert Fuller playing Dr. Kelly Brackett, Rampart's Chief of Emergency Medicine.

Emergency! ran as part of NBC's Saturday-night lineup for six entire seasons, and it was a hugely popular series, sometimes winning its time slot against CBS's popular Saturday-night comedy block, which included All in the Family. The series came to an end in 1977, but it spawned a series of telefilms that ran until 1979. Webb's company and Universal also contracted with animator Fred Calvert to produce a spin-off Saturday-morning cartoon show for NBC titled Emergency +4, which ran for three seasons (the last in reruns) and featured the paramedics Gage and DeSoto assisted by four youngsters and their three pets.

Emergency! was Webb's last sustained success. Of the remaining series his company produced, the only two that lasted longer than one season were Hec Ramsey, a two-season component of the NBC Mystery Movie wheel series that featured former Have Gun – Will Travel star Richard Boone as a pioneering forensic scientist in the Old West, and Project UFO, an anthology based on the investigations into UFOs as compiled by Project Bluebook that also ran for two seasons beginning in 1978.

Despite his string of short-lived series in the late 1970s, Webb still kept trying to recapture his previous success and decided to bring Dragnet back to television for a third series in 1983. Five scripts had been produced and Kent McCord, one of the stars of Adam-12, was cast as Joe Friday's new partner.

In 1987, Dan Aykroyd and Tom Hanks starred in a movie parody (and homage) to Webb, titled Dragnet, along with Harry Morgan, who reprised his role from the television series as Bill Gannon, who had by now become a captain of detectives. The comedy film was written and directed by Tom Mankiewicz, in his directorial debut. Aykroyd played the role of Joe Friday, described as the namesake nephew of the original series lead, while Hanks co-starred as Detective Officer Pep Streebeck, Friday's new smart-alecky and streetwise partner.

Personal life
Webb's personal life was better defined by his love of jazz than his interest in police work. He had a collection of more than 6,000 jazz recordings.  Webb's own recordings reached cult status, including his deadpan delivery of "Try A Little Tenderness". His lifelong interest in the cornet allowed him to move easily in the jazz culture, where he met singer and actress Julie London. They married in 1947 and had daughters Stacy and Lisa. They divorced in 1954. He was married three more times after that, to Dorothy Towne for two years beginning in 1955, to former Miss USA Jackie Loughery for six years beginning in 1958, and to his longtime associate, Opal Wright, for the last two years of his life.

Stacy Webb authorized and collaborated on a book, Just the Facts, Ma'am: The Authorized Biography of Jack Webb, Creator of Dragnet, Adam-12, and Emergency!, of which Daniel Moyer and Eugene Alvarez were the primary authors. It was published in 1999. Stacy did not live to see the publication of the book, having been killed in a collision with a California Highway Patrol vehicle three years earlier.

Death

Webb died of an apparent heart attack in the early morning hours of December 23, 1982, at age 62. He is interred at Sheltering Hills Plot 1999, Forest Lawn, Hollywood Hills Cemetery in Los Angeles, and was given a funeral with full Los Angeles police honors. On Webb's death, Chief Daryl Gates announced that badge number 714, which was used by Joe Friday in Dragnet, would be retired. Los Angeles Mayor Tom Bradley ordered all flags lowered to half staff in Webb's honor for a day, and Webb was buried with a replica LAPD badge bearing the rank of sergeant and the number 714.

Legacy
Webb has two stars on the Hollywood Walk of Fame, one for radio (at 7040 Hollywood Boulevard) and the other for television (at 6728 Hollywood Boulevard). In 1992, Webb was posthumously inducted into the Television Hall of Fame.

Filmography

Film

Television

Discography
 Songs from Pete Kelly's Blues (1955)
 You're My Girl: Romantic Reflections by Jack Webb (1958)
 Pete Kelly Lets His Hair Down (1958)
 Golden Throats volume 1 (1988)
 Just the Tracks, Ma'am: The Warner Brothers Recordings (2000)

References

Further reading
 

 
 
 
 
  September 12, 19, 26, October 3, 1954.

External links

 Badge 714 (Dragnet and Webb fan site)
 
 
 Pat Novak For Hire (Pat Novak For Hire fan site)
 AAFCollection.info Pictures of Jack Webb as an Air Cadet at the Rankin Aeronautical Academy at Tulare, California in 1943.

Belmont High School (Los Angeles) alumni
American male film actors
Film producers from California
United States Army Air Forces personnel of World War II
United States Army Air Forces soldiers
American male radio actors
American male television actors
American radio producers
American radio writers
American male screenwriters
American television directors
Television producers from California
American television writers
Burials at Forest Lawn Memorial Park (Hollywood Hills)
Edgar Award winners
Male actors from Los Angeles
1920 births
1982 deaths
People from Echo Park, Los Angeles
Warner Records artists
20th-century American male actors
American male television writers
20th-century American businesspeople
Film directors from Los Angeles
Screenwriters from California
20th-century American male writers
20th-century American screenwriters
People from Bunker Hill, Los Angeles